William Charles Rogers (December 13, 1847 – November 8, 1917) was born in the Cherokee Nation near present-day Skiatook, Oklahoma, USA, on December 13, 1847. A Confederate veteran and successful farmer, he entered tribal politics in 1881.

After serving as a representative and a senator in the Cherokee Council, he was elected Principal Chief of the Cherokee Nation in 1903, defeating E. L. Cookson. He served during the final liquidation of the independent Cherokee government by the United States of America and the establishment of the state of Oklahoma in 1906-7. He remained as principal chief, but with greatly diminished powers, performing largely ceremonial functions for the tribe until his death.

Early life
William Charles Rogers was the son of Charles Coody Rogers and Elizabeth McCorkle. After being educated in tribal schools, he decided to become a farmer like his father. In 1877, he constructed a general store on his own land on Bird Creek and established the original town of Skiatook.

Rogers enlisted in the Confederate Army on July 12, 1861, and served as a private for the duration of the conflict in Company E in the First Regiment of Cherokee Volunteers. After the war, he returned to his farm.

Political career
Rogers began his career in tribal politics when he ran for election as a representative of the Cooweescoowee District of the Cherokee Nation in 1881. His bid succeeded and he won reelection in 1883.In 1889, he ran for the tribal senate from the same district, and was reelected in 1889. In 1903, the so-called "Downing Party" chose him as their candidate as principal chief to replace Chief Thomas Buffington. He was opposed by E. L. Cookson, the candidate of the National Party. He was elected as the last principal chief elected under the Cherokee Nation.

At the final session of the Cherokee Council on November 9, 1904, he delivered the following message: 

Chief Rogers declined to call an election for members of the National Council in 1905. The decisions affecting the termination of the Cherokee Nation government had been made, and Rogers felt there was insufficient work remaining that would justify the cost of an election. Nevertheless, an election was held without his approval. The newly elected members remove Rogers as chief, replacing him with Frank J. Boudinot. Meanwhile, the U.S. Congress had made the Secretary of the Interior responsible for concluding the work of the Dawes Commission. The Secretary designated Rogers as the rightful chief to sign documents for the tribe. He remained in this semi-official position until 1917.

Rogers married Nannie Haynie on February 15, 1892 in Kansas City. His burial place is in Hillside Mission Cemetery, Tulsa County, Oklahoma.

After his four-year term of office was complete, he retained the status of chief, for purposes of dealing with matters of the handover of power to the United States.

Notes

Sources
Chronicles of Oklahoma, Volume 17, No. 2; June, 1939; by John Bartlett Meserve.

References

1847 births
1917 deaths
Cherokee Confederates
Pre-statehood history of Oklahoma
People from Skiatook, Oklahoma
Principal Chiefs of the Cherokee Nation
Principal Chiefs of the Cherokee Nation (1794–1907)
20th-century Native Americans